This is a list of novelists from Poland.

A
Sholem Asch (1880–1957), author of Kiddush ha-Shem (1919)

B
Jurek Becker (1937–1997), author of Jacob the Liar (1969)

C
Joseph Conrad (1857–1924), author of several novels including Heart of Darkness and Lord Jim (1900)

D
Franciszek Ksawery Dmochowski (1762–1818)
Tadeusz Dołęga-Mostowicz (1898–1939), author of a dozen popular novels including Ostatnia brygada (The Last Brigade) and Kariera Nikodema Dyzmy (The Career of Nicodemus Dyzma)
Stanisław Dygat (1914–1978), author of Pożegnania (1948), Podróż (1958), Disneyland (1965), and Dworzec w Monachium (1973)

G
Cyprian Godebski (1765–1809)
Witold Gombrowicz (1904–1969), author of Ferdydurke (1937), Trans-Atlantyk (1953), Pornografia (1960), and Cosmos (1967)
Henryk Grynberg (born 1936)

K
Juliusz Kaden-Bandrowski (1885–1944)
Maria Konopnicka (1842–1910)
Jerzy Kosiński (1933–1991)
Daniel Koziarski (born 1979)
Ignacy Krasicki (1735–1810)
Józef Ignacy Kraszewski (1812–1887)
Maria Kuncewiczowa (1895–1989)

Ł
Jadwiga Łuszczewska (1834–1908)

M
Józef Mackiewicz (1902–1985)
Maria Ilnicka (1825 or 1827–1897)
Małgorzata Musierowicz (born 1945)

O
Eliza Orzeszkowa (1842–1910)
Ferdynand Antoni Ossendowski (1876–1945)
Hanna Ożogowska (1904–1995)

P
Bolesław Prus (1847–1912), author of The Outpost (Placówka, 1886), The Doll (Lalka, 1889), The New Woman (Emancypantki, 1893), and Pharaoh (Faraon, 1895)
Stanisław Przybyszewski (1868–1927)

R
Władysław Reymont (1868–1925)
Maria Rodziewiczówna (1863–1944)
Adolf Rudnicki (1912–1990)

S
Henryk Sienkiewicz (1846–1916)
Wacław Sieroszewski (1858–1945)
Żanna Słoniowska (born 1978)
Udo Steinke (1942–1999)

T
Olga Tokarczuk (born 1962)
Szczepan Twardoch (born 1979)

Z
Jan Chryzostom Zachariasiewicz (1823–1906), author of Skromne nadzieje (1854), Na kresach (1860), Święty Jur, vol. 1–3 (1862), Człowiek bez jutra (1871) Zły interes (1876), Wybór pism, a collection of works, vol. 1–11 (1886–1888)
Adam Zagajewski (1945–2021)
Włodzimierz Zagórski (writer) (1834–1902) author of Pamiętnik starego parasola (1884) and Wilcze plemię (1885)
Anna Zahorska (1878 or 1882–1942) author of Utopia, Trucizny (1928)
Stefania Zahorska (1890–1961), author of Stacja Abbesses (1952)
Maria Julia Zaleska (1831–1889), author of Niezgodni królewicze (1889)
Kazimierz Zalewski (1849–1919), author of Syn przemytnika (1884)
Witold Zalewski (1921–2009), author of Ostatni postój (novel about January Uprising, 1979) and Zakładnicy (2001)
Gabriela Zapolska (1857–1921), author of 23 novels
Kazimierz Zdziechowski (1878–1942), author of Fuimus (1900)
Emil Zegadłowicz (1888–1941)

Ż
Stefan Żeromski (1864–1925), author of Ashes (Popioły, 1902–03) and The Faithful River (Wierna rzeka, 1912)
Jerzy Żuławski (1874–1915)
Mirosław Żuławski (1913–1995)
Eugeniusz Żytomirski (1911–1975)

See also
List of Poles

Poland
novelists